Nagasari is a traditional Indonesia steamed cake, originating from Javanese cuisine, made of rice flour, coconut milk and sugar, filled with a slice of banana and wrapped in banana leaves.

Etymology
Naga in Javanese language means "a big snake; a dragon". It refers to a mythical green snake in the Old Java that brings fertility to the earth. The word is derived from a Sanskrit word naga. Sari means "beautiful; fertile; patient" or "seed; flower".

Nagasari literally means "the seed of the dragon" or "the beautiful dragon". Since the Javanese dragon is often depicted as a green snake, the food is thus given green color. 

The word nagasari can also refer to: 1) a specific tree; 2) a specific batik pattern.

Variants

Nagasari comes in green color (the most common) and white (less common). The green color comes from pandan leaves extract. White nagasaris are called legendo in Magelang.

In modern time, people start making different colors of nagasari. Blue nagasari, among them, gets its blue color from butterfly pea flowers.

Nagasari is commonly sold in Indonesian traditional market as a jajan pasar.

See also

 List of steamed foods
 Javanese cuisine
 Indonesian cuisine

References

External links 
 Kue Nagasari recipe (in Indonesian)

Dumplings
Vegetarian dishes of Indonesia
Banana dishes
Kue
Steamed foods